The 1907–08 Kansas Jayhawks men's basketball team represented the University of Kansas in its tenth season of collegiate basketball, and its first in the newly formed Missouri Valley Intercollegiate Athletic Association, or MVIAA. After finishing 6–0 in the MVIAA, the Jayhawks won the MVIAA Conference Championship, their first conference championship. The head coach was Phog Allen, serving in his first year of his first tenure. The Jayhawks finished the season 18–6. Following a 19–11 defeat of William Jewell, the Jayhawks had a winning all-time record for the first time. The Jayhawks haven't had a losing all-time record since.

Roster
Ralph Bergen
Louis Larson
George McCune
Milton Miller
William Miller
Roger Peard
Paul Wohler
Earl Woodward

Schedule

References

Kansas Jayhawks men's basketball seasons
Kansas
Kansas
Kansas